Klĭtôrĭs (Greek: Key) is the fifth studio album by Nigerian singer Brymo. It was released independently on May 9, 2016, and made available for pre-order on iTunes prior to its release. The album comprises 11 tracks and was preceded by the lead single "Happy Memories". Brymo's girlfriend Esse Kakada is featured on the song "Naked". Pulse Nigeria included Klĭtôrĭs among the 10 Best Nigerian Albums of 2016. Klĭtôrĭs was nominated for Best R&B/Pop Album at The Headies 2016 and for Album of the Year at The Headies 2018.

Background
Klĭtôrĭs was recorded between 2015 and 2016. The original artwork for the album was designed by Georgi Georgiev of Moonring Art Design. It features the haunting image of a creature that appears to be the mutation of a half-naked woman, a decaying bird, and a beast with vast antlers. An edited version of the artwork was done by Duks after iTunes refused to put up the original artwork. In an interview with Nigerian Entertainment Today, Brymo said the title of the album means key in the Greek language and that the album is an expression of love and the uncertainty of it. He said, "the album is the key to a certain door I have knocked on for years; and yes it was meant to be sensual, there ought to be two sides to the coin".

Composition
The album's opener "Naked" consists of a consortium of instruments, such as the shekere, iya ilu, and marimba; the record talks about the kind of consuming love that burns and leaves nothing behind. "Dem Dey Go" is an allegory for Nigeria's current fragile state. In the positive pleading "Happy Memories", Brymo recalls a man lost in the vastness of love's simple pleasures. The Afrobeat dance-fest "Alajọ Ṣomolu" is a nod to the famed thrift collectors of old Shomolu market. The folksy track "Ko Ṣ'aya Mi" features a chant-like chorus and timed interludes that is reminiscent of spoken word. In "Let's Make Love", Brymo reflects on his greed and sins. Michael Kolawole described the song as "a moment of reflection disguised as lovemaking". Kolawole also likened "Let's Make Love" to "Naked" and said both songs are "moments of clarity, self-consciousness and discovery for Brymo". In "Mirage", listeners are left to comprehend things on their own. The electro-house record "The Way the Cookie Crumbles" explores sonic experimentation and is reminiscent of semi-pop records from the 1980s and 1990s.

Singles and other releases 
The album's lead single "Happy Memories" was released on April 25, 2016. The accompanying music video for "Something Good is Happening" was released on June 20, 2016. It was directed by Uche Chukwu and captures the daily lifestyle of the average Nigerian. Each scene in the video tells a story of an individual's approach to life, both young and old.

Brymo premiered the music video for "Alajọ Ṣomolu" on September 4, 2016. Directed by  cinematographer Uche Chukwu, the video showcases Brymo's portrayal of the popular Ṣomolu-based thrift collector. The video is set in a coffee shop at the Jazz Hole and shows jazz records by Miles Davis. On January 10, 2017, Brymo released a documentary-style music video for "Billion Naira Dream". It was co-directed by cinematographers Dare and Uche Chukwu and reveals an intimate side of Brymo.

Critical reception

Klĭtôrĭs received positive critical acclaim from music critics. In a review for Pulse Nigeria, Joey Akan called the album a "formula that has yielded dividends with each new application" and acknowledged Brymo for exploring the theme of love. Ade Tayo of Simply African Music said the album "makes the art of storytelling king" and  described it as being very "cultural", "multi-faceted" and "assorted". In a review for the website Music in Africa, music journalist Oris Aigbokhaevbolo wrote that although the album isn't quite as excellent as Tabula Rasa, it is a "much happier album than its predecessor".

Tope Delano of TooXclusive praised the album's storytelling technique and artful arrangement, saying it is "no doubt a reaffirmation that he is king of soul and even better, a grown man, lover and best friend". Reviewing for 360nobs, Wilfred Okichie characterized the album as a "damn fine record" and said its "mixing, composition and finish is indeed second to none". Udochukwu Ikwuagwu of Legit.ng stated that Klĭtôrĭs "shows a melancholic Brymo and his sad thoughts, he chirps in some optimism in-between the sheets".

Accolades

Track listing

Release history

References

2016 albums
Brymo albums
Yoruba-language albums